Saline Grace is a Germany-based alternative band that emerged from the German avantgarde band Nobility Of Salt and was founded by Ricardo Hoffmann and Ines Hoffmann (née Pollok) in 2005.

History

1994 – 2004
Ricardo Hoffmann, singer, songwriter and multi-instrumentalist of Saline Grace, was born in the eastern border town of Frankfurt (Oder), Germany, on 21 January 1975. In 1994 he founded his first band project, becoming two years later, in 1996, the avantgarde band Nobility Of Salt. At that time the band consisted of René Hoffmann (vocal), Ricardo Hoffmann as Nobility Of Salt's songwriter (guitar, keyboards and percussion), Ines Pollok (guitar) and Stephan Weidner (bass). 
In 1997 the band released a first demo tape, The Evening Prayer, and moved to London, where soon afterwards Stephan Weidner left Nobility Of Salt, making room for Ines Pollok, who has assumed his role on bass until nowadays.
Numerous UK gigs left appropriate traces on a further demo-tape, Through Clouds And Thoughtful Years, in 1998 and even the now defunct British music magazine Melody Maker took notice of Nobility Of Salt in its issue of 20 March 1999. 
"At the beginning of 2000 and after three years’ residence in Britain, the band worked on their first album in Berlin, Germany, releasing The Tremulous Sea a few months later. After releasing the EP The Silent Ship in 2002, followed a further album release, called Those Narrow Streets, in 2004. Due to organisational reasons, this should be the last Nobility Of Salt album for the time being."

2005 - 2009
These developments paved the way for Saline Grace and in 2005 Ricardo Hoffmann began to work on material for the first Saline Grace album. On this occasion, he was supported by his wife and long-term bass player, Ines Hoffmann (née Pollok), who was born on 20 July 1976 in Frankfurt (Oder) as well. Joining the former band Nobility Of Salt in 1996, she has shared the musical trail, her fate as well as the inspirations with Ricardo Hoffmann until nowadays. Saline Grace released their critically acclaimed debut album, Border Town Shades, in September 2007.
In 2009 Saline Grace and Nobility Of Salt were included in Music To Die For, a book by British music journalist Mick Mercer (Melody Maker), which is an encyclopedia of the alternative and gothic scene with descriptions, interviews and discographies of the bands.

2010 - 2012

"In 2011, during the recording and mixing process for a further Saline Grace album, Ricardo Hoffmann made time for a short guest appearance, joining Hamburg-based band Dark Orange on their 2CD album Horizont. Along with Steven Burrows, a member of English cult band And Also The Trees, on bass, Ricardo Hoffmann contributed on additional guitars and piano. Whilst involved in the final work and video shootings for Saline Grace in 2012, he furthermore created his "Rising Stream Mix" of the Dark Orange song "Traumwandler" for Interpretations, the second CD of the same Dark Orange release; other remixes were made by artists like Robin Guthrie of Cocteau Twins, members of And Also The Trees and many more."

2013 up to the present
From 2013 onwards, further Saline Grace releases followed. On 21st January 2013 the band with frontman Ricardo Hoffmann released their second album Fog Mountain and four years later Blacksmith’s Fire on 4th September 2017. In 2021, due to the alarming political developments in his home country, Ricardo Hoffmann put out his first release in his national language with Saline Grace's single Der Meister der Intrige. On 21st January 2023, Saline Grace released their latest album The Whispering Woods.

Musical style

Until nowadays, Saline Grace have set great store by the use of almost exclusively acoustic instruments that seem to hail from an antique musical instruments shop. The extraordinarily filigree guitar style with its wistful slide techniques, mandolin-like ornaments, fingerstyle parts or 1960’s twang sounds is recognisably Ricardo Hoffmann’s, who knows to create pictorial synaesthesias, raising nightly panoramas from imaginatively enraptured roadmovies. His quite sophisticated, in English written lyrics reflect frequently anthropo-philosophical backgrounds and are full of symbolism. Subtly woven into a sound stage, mainly consisting of piano, organ, concertina, banjo, violin, accentuated drums, not uncommonly played with brushes, as well as Ines Hoffmann’s deeply resonating bass, the arrangements draw marvellously attention to the emotional baritone of Ricardo Hoffmann who reminds occasionally on singer like Nick Cave or Leonard Cohen.

Band's name
The mental nearness to the water, explicitly to the origin of earthly existence - our world’s oceans, was already the idea behind Saline Grace’s precursor, Nobility Of Salt. Thus the common thread was consequently continued. "Tied to that saline grace of a noble but fragile ocean," states Ricardo Hoffmann in 'The Valley' on Saline Grace's debut album‚ Border Town Shades, whereby this line was conducive to finding the band's name.

Discography

Studio albums
Border Town Shades (CD 2007/DWRCD03)
Fog Mountain (CD 2013/DWRCD04)
Blacksmith's Fire (CD 2017/DWRCD05)
The Whispering Woods (CD 2023/DWRAL06)

Singles
Der Meister der Intrige (Single 2021/DWRSI05)
The Evening Prayer (Single 2023/DWRSIN06)

Appearances
Dark Spy Compilation V0l. 17 (CD 2008/Dark Spy Magazine – Issue No. 23)
Mick Mercer - Music To Die For (Cherry Red Books 2009)
Dark Orange – Horizont (2CD 2012/Kal41)
Orkus! Compilation 87 (CD 2013/Orkus! Magazine – Issue No. 03 – March 2013)
Cold Hands Seduction – Vol. 191 (CD 2017/Sonic Seducer – September 2017)

As Nobility Of Salt
The Evening Prayer (Demo 1997)
Through Clouds And Thoughtful Years (Demo 1998)
The Tremulous Sea (first album 2000/DWRCD01)
The Silent Ship EP (CDM 2002/DWRCDM01)
Those Narrow Streets (CD 2004/DWRCD02)

References

External links

Official Nobility Of Salt Website

German alternative rock groups
Musical groups from Berlin
1994 establishments in Germany
Musical groups established in 1994